Midway is an unincorporated community in Putnam County, West Virginia, United States. The community is located on the east bank of the Kanawha River on West Virginia Route 62 at the mouth of Midway Hollow.

Notes

Unincorporated communities in Putnam County, West Virginia
Unincorporated communities in West Virginia
Charleston, West Virginia metropolitan area
Populated places on the Kanawha River